Kampung Masan is a settlement in Sarawak, Malaysia.

Neighbouring settlements include:

References

Populated places in Sarawak